Ithu Kathirvelan Kadhal is a 2014 Indian Tamil-language romantic comedy drama film written and directed by S. R. Prabhakaran starring Udhayanidhi Stalin and Nayanthara. Santhanam and Sunder Ramu  play important roles in the film while Saranya Ponvannan and Chaya Singh play supporting roles. Produced by Red Giant Films, the film has cinematography by Balasubramanium  and art direction by V Selvaraj.

Plot 
The film opens with a prologue, in which a person is being taken to a hospital and the doctor later reporting that the person's condition will be known only after sometime. The scene then shifts a few months back.

Enter Kathirvelan aka Kathir (Udhayanidhi Stalin), a Madurai-based minibus owner who is a devout Hindu and devotee of Lord Anjaneya since the age of five. Due to his devotion for Lord Maruti, he does not show any interest in women.

One day, while returning from a Sri Anjaneya temple, he sees his elder sister,  Vineethra (Chaya Singh) crying outside his house after his father (Aadukalam Naren) refused to take her in, having disowned her for eloping with a Coimbatore-based mill owner Shanmugham (Dr. Bharath Reddy) against his wishes. Vineethra, however, now has issues with Shanmugham, as a result of which, she left him and returned to her father's house. On Kathir's cajoling, his father reluctantly accepts Vineethra into the house. Kathir then decides to find out what caused the standoff between Vineethra and Shanmugham and leaves for Coimbatore, lying to his father that he is headed for Salem to do some work related to his minibus business. Before leaving, he is warned by Vineethra not to fall for Shanmugham's neighbor, Pavithra (Nayanthara), as her father and Shanmugham are sworn enemies.

In Coimbatore, Kathir successfully manages to resolve the conflict between Vineethra and Shanmugham, with Vineethra returning to Coimbatore eventually. He, however, does not return to Madurai immediately, staying back in Coimbatore after noticing Pavithra and falling in love with her, despite Vineethra's warning and his devotion to Lord Bajrangbali. Determined to win Pavithra's heart, he takes the help of his college friend Mayilvaganam aka Mayil (Santhanam), who is a medical doctor, finds out that Pavithra is working as a manager in a Panasonic showroom. The duo go there so that Kathir can speak to Pavithra, but end up creating a scene, forcing Pavithra to throw both of them out. After Pavithra notices Kathir constantly following her, she confronts him and threatens to take him to the police, which increases the friction between them. However, when Pavithra finds out how Kathir had saved Vineethra's marriage, she forgives him and becomes his friend, but later reveals that she is in love with a businessman, Gautham (Sunder Ramu), which breaks Kathir's heart. To add to Kathir's woes, Shanmugham finds out that he is in love with Pavithra, and kicks him out of his house for showing interest in his enemy's daughter. Meanwhile, back in Madurai, his father too disowns him after finding out that he had not gone to Salem after all. Without a place to stay now, Kathir moves into Mayil's home.

Kathir soon finds out that Pavithra's boyfriend Gautham is a womanizer, planning to dump Pavithra after having a one-night stand with her at his friend's upcoming marriage in Ooty. He tells her about this, but she rubbishes his claims and admonishes him for still hitting on her. However, she soon realizes the truth about Gautham after he attempts to kiss her in his car causing her to dump him. She and Kathir reconcile, but she now realizes that she has feelings for Kathir. With the help of Mayil and Pavithra's Malayali friend (Kala Kalyani), who Mayil has fallen in love with, they soon express their feelings for one another.

Trouble soon erupts however, after Shanmugham and Pavithra's father find out that Kathir and Pavithra are in love. Kathir and Pavithra decide that the only way Shanmugham and Pavithra's father can accept their relationship is to make them reconcile, as it is revealed by Shanmugham, that he and Pavithra's father are sworn enemies due to the enmity which existed between the latter and Shanmugham's deceased father, who happened to be Pavithra's paternal uncle. They take the help of a mimicry artist, Balaraman (Mayilsamy), who mimics both Shanmugham's and Pavithra's father's voices in the presence of the real Pavithra's father and Shanmugham respectively, which eventually leads to Shanmugham and Pavithra's father reconciling.

With the initial hurdle cleared, Kathir and Mayil then plan to convince Kathir's father, who has now reconciled with Kathir, but is also searching for a bride for him, to allow Kathir to marry Pavithra. However, while trying to tell Kathir's father about Pavithra, Mayil consumes poison and is immediately rushed to the hospital, which it is later revealed that Mayil pretended to poison himself by pretending to swallow laxatives, fearing the wrath of Kathir's father, and thereby revealing the identity of the person in the prologue. On returning home, Kathir tells his father about Pavithra, who, as expected, becomes furious and locks himself up in his room. Later, Kathir manages to calm down his father and adds that he will not marry Pavithra as long as he refuses to accept their relationship, whilst also saying that, unlike Vineethra, he does not want to marry without seeking his father's permission. On hearing of this, his father forgives Kathir, accepts his relationship with Pavithra and gives the go ahead signal for their marriage.

The film ends with Kathir and Pavithra getting married happily.

Cast 

 Udhayanidhi Stalin as Kathirvelan
 Nayanthara as Pavithra Mahalingam
 Santhanam as Mayilvaganam
 Sunder Ramu as Gautham
 Chaya Singh as Vineethra Shanmugam
 Dr. Bharath Reddy as Shanmugam
 Saranya Ponvannan as Yasothammal
 Aadukalam Naren as Kathirvelan's father
 Aadukalam Murugadoss as Kathirvelan's friend
 Jayaprakash as Mahalingam  Pavithra's father
 Vanitha Krishnachandran as Pavithra's mother
 Kala Kalyani as Pavithra's friend
 Mohana as Pavithra's friend
 Neethu Neelambaran as Vinotha
 Mayilsamy as Pala Kural Mannan Balaraman (cameo appearance)
 Swaminathan as a man in Hanuman getup (cameo appearance)

Production 
Ithu Kathirvelan Kadhal, started its shoot on 22 February 2013 in Chennai. The film released on 14 February 2014 across 320 screens in Tamil Nadu.

Soundtrack 

Music was composed by Harris Jayaraj who had collaborated with S. R. Prabhakaran for the first time. The album was released on 10 January 2014 to generally positive reviews, with "Maelae Maelae" and "Anbae Anbae" being favourites. Critics felt that the soundtrack had "a handful of bright moments".

Release 
The film was dubbed into Telugu as Seenugadi Love Story.

Critical reception 

The Hindu said, "A few laughs, but overstuffed with subplots". Sify wrote, "the story is wafer-thin and weak and none of the characters are well-etched out. Every scene looks contrived and manipulated. This film doesn't work because it's hard to empathize with any of the characters and the actors fail to rise above the flawed script". The New Indian Express wrote, "Idhu Kathirvelan Kadhal may not be a great film. But it's a fairly decent family entertainer that wouldn't bore one.". The Times of India gave 3/5 and wrote, "The film isn't bad per se but displays very little ambition and is only mildly interesting.". Indiaglitz gave a rating of 3/5 and wrote, "Though there are quite a number of relishing moments, the screenplay is mediocre, the scenes apart from Santhanam-Udhay-Nayan has nothing big to offer. Prabhakaran's story telling is sweet with an emotional climax, however does not spring you the WOW factor".  Behindwoods gave it 2.5/5 and called it "A rom-com family drama which falls short of realizing its full potential". Siddarth Srinivas of Cinemalead gave 2.5/5 and stated that the film is "A pleasant entertainer with the right mix of comedy, romance and morals.". Rediff.com gave 2.5/5 and wrote, "Idhu Kathirvelan Kadhal is a simple love story with a good mix of romance, comedy and sentiment. Though nothing extraordinary, the film makes a good Valentine's Day watch", calling it a "feel good entertainer". Oneindia gave 2.5/5 stars and wrote, "Many felt that Idhu Kathirvelan Kadhal would be on the lines of Udhayanidhi Stalin's debut movie Oru Kal Oru Kannadi. But it is not. Indeed, the latest film comes out as an entertaining film with good things about the values of family". IANS gave 2/5 and concluded, "Idhu Kathirvelan Kadhal is a done to death rom-com that hardly entertains.". Bharath Vijaykumar of Moviecrow gave 2.75/5 and concluded, "A fairly entertaining family drama that is worth a watch thanks to some clean fun sans vulgarity and violence.".

References

External links 
 

2010s Tamil-language films
2014 comedy films
2014 drama films
2014 films
2014 romantic comedy-drama films
Films scored by Harris Jayaraj
Films shot in Coimbatore
Films shot in Madurai
Indian romantic comedy-drama films